Chansons pour les pieds was a 2001 album by Jean-Jacques Goldman sung in French. The album was recorded at the Théâtre du Cratère d'Alès by Eric Van de Hel and Gildas Lointier, assisted by Renaud Van Welden. All songs were written by the singer himself. Released by JRG, the album met smash success on the charts : it topped the French and Belgian Albums Charts and remained charted for almost two years, and was #2 in Switzerland. As the title ("Songs for the Feet") suggests, all the tracks are devoted to dance and represent music styles (canon chorale, gigue, technoriental, slow, tarentelle, R&B, ballad, disco, rock, slow zouk, fanfare swing, pop).

There was a sole single from this album : "Et l'on y peut rien", which peaked at #7 in France, 37 in Belgium (Wallonia) and #61 in Switzerland.

Track listing
 "Ensemble" – 3:59
 "Et l'on n'y peut rien" – 3:38
 "Une poussière" – 5:33
 "La pluie" – 8:25
 "Tournent les violons" – 4:38
 "Un goût sur tes lèvres" – 4:29
 "Si je t'avais pas" – 4:50
 "C'est pas vrai" – 4:56
 "The Quo's in town tonite" – 5:14
 "Je voudrais vous revoir" – 5:12
 "Les p'tits chapeaux" – 3:54
 "Les choses" – 8:38
 "La vie c'est mieux quand on est amoureux" 1

1 Hidden track

Source : Allmusic.

Personnel
Adapted from AllMusic.

 Gildas Arzel – guitar, mandocello, oud, primary artist, slide guitar
 Eric Benzi – arranger, engineer, programming, realization
 Francois Breugnot – violone
 Yvan Cassar – musical direction
 Gilles Chabenat – primary artist, vielle
 Marc Chantereau – percussion, primary artist
 Nicolas Duport – engineer
 Claude Gassian – photography
 Michel Gaucher – primary artist, trombone
 Jean-Jacques Goldman – primary artist, realization
 Alexis Grosbois – booklet design, coordination
 Christophe Guiot – concert master
 Didier Havet – euphonium, bass trombone
 Michael Jones – choeurs, guitar
 Raphaël Jonin – gravure
 Denis Leloup – primary artist, trombone
 Christian Lemaitre – violone
 Bruno LeRouzic – cornemuse, primary artist
 Gildas Lointier – advisor, engineer, sound recording
 Christian Martinez – primary artist, trumpet
 Eric Mula – primary artist
 Christophe Negre – director, flute, alto saxophone, soprano saxophone, tenor saxophone
 Fréderic Paris – flute
 Carlo Rizzo – primary artist, tambourine
 Phillipe Slominski – bugle, trumpet
 Jean-Pierre Solves – clarinet, piccolo, alto saxophone, baritone saxophone
 Patrice Tison – guitar effects, performer, primary artist
 Renaud Van Welden – assistant publisher

Charts

Certifications

Release history

References

2001 albums
Jean-Jacques Goldman albums
Albums produced by Erick Benzi